Outer membrane transport proteins (OMPP1/FadL/TodX)  family includes several proteins that are involved in toluene catabolism and degradation of aromatic hydrocarbons. This family also includes protein FadL involved in translocation of long-chain
fatty acids across the outer membrane. It is also a receptor for the
bacteriophage T2.

Notes

References 
 
 
 

Protein families
Outer membrane proteins